Baidak was a wooden sailing ship, similar to a cog. It had a  flush-laid flat bottom approximately 3–4 metres wide, which narrowed to tapered ends, and one 5 metre mast. Measuring approximately 15–20 (or 36–60) metres in length, a baidak could carry a load of approximately 200 tons. It could be operated by oars or sail.

Baidaky were in use from the 16th–19th centuries in the territory of present-day Ukraine, primarily for cargo delivery on the Dnipro and Don rivers, however, they were also frequently used by the Zaporizhian Cossacks for their military campaigns to the Black Sea.

References

See also 
 Chaika (boat)

Merchant sailing ship types
Naval ships of Ukraine
Zaporozhian Host
Cossack culture